State Route 151 (SR 151) is a state highway in the central portion of the U.S. state of Tennessee.

Route description

SR 151 begins in Macon County at an intersection with SR 56 in downtown Red Boiling Springs. It goes southeastward as E Main Street to leave the town and have an interchange with SR 52.  It continues southeast through farmland to cross into the southwestern corner of Clay County for a short distance before crossing into the mountains of Jackson County. SR 151 continues southeastward through the mountains along a narrow valley before entering North Springs and coming to an end at an intersection with SR 56. The entire route of SR 151 is a rural two-lane highway.

Major intersections

References

151
Transportation in Macon County, Tennessee
Transportation in Clay County, Tennessee
Transportation in Jackson County, Tennessee